Egonu is a surname. Notable people with the surname include:

Paola Egonu (born 1998), Italian volleyball player of Nigerian heritage
Uzo Egonu (1931–1996), Nigerian artist

See also
Egonu (crater)

Surnames of Ugandan origin
Surnames of Nigerian origin